The Peugeot 4007 is a compact crossover SUV produced by Mitsubishi Motors for the French automobile marque Peugeot, between July 2007 and April 2012. The equivalent Citroën badge-engineered version was the C-Crosser. Both were produced in Mitsubishi's Nagoya Plant in Okazaki, Japan, based on the second-generation Outlander. It was shown at the Geneva Motor Show in March 2007.

Together, the 4007 and C-Crosser were the first Japan-produced cars sold under any French brand. They had their sales target of 30,000 units per year. It was officially launched on 12 July 2007.

Both vehicle had been planned to be assembled in the Nedcar plant in Born, Netherlands for the European market, however the plan was postponed indefinitely as sales of the two models fell below the target of 30,000 units.

Engines

2.2 L (2179 cc) DW12 HDi turbodiesel straight-4, 115 kW (156 PS), ; with a particulate filter and a six speed gearbox, and able to run on 30% biodiesel.
2.0 L (1998 cc) 4B11 Petrol DOHC 16 valve I4, 147 PS (same engine as the Outlander) — for Russian market only
2.4 L 4B12 Petrol DOHC 16 valve MIVEC I4,  170 PS (same engine as the Outlander)

Models
There were three available trim levels for the Peugeot 4007, all featuring a 2.2 Hdi engine:
SE — The standard model, with alloy wheels, climate control, heated mirrors, power steering etc.
Sport XS — SE trim, plus leather seats and a telephone.
GT — SE trim, plus headlamp washers, CD multichanger, heated leather seats, telephone, etc.

Sales and production

References

External links

Official international 4007 English website
4007 Unofficial infosite

4007
Cars introduced in 2007
2010s cars
Compact sport utility vehicles
Crossover sport utility vehicles
Front-wheel-drive vehicles
All-wheel-drive vehicles
VDL Nedcar vehicles